Jacqueline Bloch is a French physicist, born in 1967, specialist in nanosciences, member of the French Academy of sciences.

Biography 
Jacqueline Bloch is an ESPCI engineer, graduated in 1991 (106th promotion), with a DEA in condensed matter physics (1990). She holds a doctorate from the Pierre and Marie Curie University on the study of the optical properties of quantum wires. In 1994, she joined the CNRS and carried out her research at the L2M (Laboratoire de microstructures et de microélecroniques) in Bagneux, which moved and became the LPN (Laboratoire de photonique et nanostructures) in Marcoussis in 2001. In 1998, she spent a year there and carried out research at the Bell Laboratories. She is interested in the ultimate coupling between light and matter in close connection with semiconductor nanotechnologies. In particular, she has made important discoveries in the study of the physics of polaritons.

Awards 
   2014: Chevalier of the Légion d'Honneur

   2015 : Jean-Ricard Prize of the French Physical Society

   2017: CNRS Silver Medal

   2019 : Prix Ampère de l'Electricité de France of the French Academy of Sciences

   2019: Elected member of the French Academy of Sciences in the Physics Section.

References 

1967 births
French physicists
French National Centre for Scientific Research scientists
Members of the French Academy of Sciences
University of Paris alumni
Living people
French women physicists